George Allan Kennedy (5 May 1919 – 24 October 1979) was an Australian rules footballer who played with North Melbourne in the VFL.

Kennedy had his best season in 1941, kicking 37 goals, finishing equal 6th in the Brownlow Medal count and winning North Melbourne's best and fairest.

References

External links

George Kennedy's genealogical profile

1919 births
1979 deaths
Sydney Swans players
North Melbourne Football Club players
Syd Barker Medal winners
Australian rules footballers from Melbourne
People from Footscray, Victoria